Acarlar is a town in İncirliova district of Aydın Province, Turkey. It is situated to the south of İncirliova and Turkish state highway . The population of the Acarlar was 10,866 as of 2012. According to the mayor's page, the settlement was founded by a group of people who named themselves as "Abdals" from Adana (although an alternative theory claims that these people were refugees from Russia after a Russo-Turkish War). In 1930s, the settlement was named by the governor of the province. In 1972, it was declared a seat of township.

References

Populated places in Aydın Province
Towns in Turkey
İncirliova District